Bob Parent may refer to:

 Bob Parent (photographer) (1923–1987), Canadian-born photographer
 Bob Parent (ice hockey) (born 1958), retired ice hockey player 
 Bob Parent (professor), professor at University of Wisconsin-Madison